Václav Kristek (born 21 June 1996) is a Czech male canoeist who won four medals (two gold) at senior level at the Wildwater Canoeing World Championships.

References

External links
 
  at Kanoe.cz 

1996 births
Living people
Czech male canoeists
Place of birth missing (living people)